On September 21, 2007, Governor of New York Eliot Spitzer issued an executive order directing that state offices allow illegal aliens to be issued driver's licenses effective December 2007. The measure was introduced three times. Once, as an executive order that was later withdrawn, then revamped as a legislative bill, which was defeated in the New York State Senate, and finally introduced as an administrative measure through the Department of Motor Vehicles and withdrawn again after heavy public and political opposition.

First and second plans

Applicants for driver's licenses would not be required to prove legal immigration status and would be allowed to present a foreign passport as identification. At that point, eight other states did not require individuals to prove their legal immigration status when applying for a driver's licenses. Spitzer said that the new policy would help all New Yorkers by improving traffic safety, because unlicensed drivers are nearly five times as likely to be in fatal car crashes compared to licensed drivers. Spitzer also claimed that the policy would effectively allow illegal immigrants to buy auto insurance, which would reduce the number of uninsured drivers in the state and therefore decrease insurance premiums for all New Yorkers by an estimated $120 million.

After meeting with the Department of Homeland Security in October 2007, Spitzer agreed that licenses issued to illegal aliens would look different from other licenses and that the new licenses would not allow access to airplanes and federal buildings.

Applicants for driver's licenses would not be required to prove legal immigration status and would be allowed to present a foreign passport as identification. After meeting with the Department of Homeland Security in October 2007, Spitzer altered the plan so that licenses issued to illegal aliens would look different from other licenses and that the new licenses would not allow access to airplanes and federal buildings.

Reaction
The Spitzer proposal was met with massive criticism from both Republicans and Democrats. Critics charged that the plan would open the door for illegal aliens to obtain official identification and compromise security improvements made since September 11, 2001. His critics included Democratic presidential candidate Senator Christopher Dodd, who denounced the proposal at a debate held on October 30. After a day of equivocation following the debate, Senator Hillary Clinton issued a prepared statement that endorsed the plan. New York City Mayor Michael Bloomberg opposed the executive order, calling it "inappropriate." Minority leader of the State Assembly, James Tedisco, promised a lawsuit to block the proposal. 

County clerks across the state would have been required to issue driver's licenses to illegal aliens, but thirteen county clerks promised not to do so. One such clerk who denounced the proposal was Erie County Clerk Kathy Hochul, who was appointed to serve an interim term in her office by Spitzer. She was elected to serve the remaining three years of the term of her predecessor, state Motor Vehicles Commissioner David Swarts, after vocally breaking with Spitzer. 

Others who opposed the proposal included Democratic Congresswoman Kirsten Gillibrand, Democratic County Executive Steve Levy of Suffolk County, and Long Island Democratic State Senator Craig Johnson. While the issue initially was significant only in New York, cable TV and talk radio made this a national controversy, as one of Spitzer's strongest critics was CNN host Lou Dobbs, who labeled Spitzer an "idiot" for this policy. While opposition to the driver's license proposal emerged from both political parties, Spitzer claimed his opponents were aligned with the "rabid right."

Senate vote
On October 21, 2007, the State Senate voted to oppose the Spitzer plan by a 39-19 vote. Eight Democrats from moderate districts broke with Spitzer on the vote. After the vote, The New York Times called this issue "Mr. Spitzer’s single most unpopular decision since he took office."

Third plan
Following the State Senate's vote, Spitzer revised his plan again, proposing the issuance of a third type of driver's license. This driver's license would be available only to United States citizens who are New York State residents, and would be valid for crossing the Canada–US border. Spitzer also announced that the expiration dates of temporary visas would be printed on the driver's licenses of individuals on temporary visas.

Reaction
A poll conducted by Survey USA on October 3 reported that 56% of New Yorkers opposed the Governor's plan. By November 13, a poll by Siena College reported that 70% of New Yorkers opposed his plan; furthermore, only 25% would vote to re-elect Spitzer.

On November 14, the day following the release of the Siena College poll, Governor Spitzer announced he would withdraw the plan to issue driver's licenses to illegal immigrants, acknowledging that it would never be implemented. The decision drew derision from the press, as the Associated Press termed this reversal a "surrender." WCBS-TV labeled him "Governor Flip-Flop." State Senator Rubén Díaz of the Bronx said he was "betrayed" by Spitzer's abandonment of the plan.

Later developments
On June 27, 2019, New York Gov. Andrew Cuomo signed the Green Light Bill into law. The law allows undocumented immigrants to apply for and obtain driver licenses.

References

2007 controversies in the United States
2007 in American politics
2007 in New York (state)
Eliot Spitzer
Political history of New York (state)
Illegal immigration to the United States
Political controversies in the United States